is a railway station on the Himi Line in the city of Takaoka, Toyama Prefecture, Japan, operated by West Japan Railway Company (JR West).

Lines 

Station layout 
The station has a single side platform, serving a single bi-directional track. The station is unattended.

Adjacent stations

History
The station opened on 1 April 1916 as Nakagawa Station. It was renamed to its present name on 1 September 1920. With the privatization of Japanese National Railways (JNR) on 1 April 1987, the station came under the control of JR West.

Passenger statistics
In fiscal 2015, the station was used by an average of 1234 passengers daily (boarding passengers only).

Surrounding area
 Takaoka City Hall

See also
 List of railway stations in Japan

References

External links

  

Railway stations in Toyama Prefecture
Stations of West Japan Railway Company
Railway stations in Japan opened in 1916
Himi Line
Takaoka, Toyama